Tim Clawson (born 1960) is an American film and television producer, film studio executive and screenwriter.

Clawson is best known as the screenwriter of the film They Call Me Bruce and the executive in charge of production on such films as Scream 4, Piranha 3-D, The Reader and Inglourious Basterds, and television shows including ''Salute Your Shorts.

In August 2012, he was hired as vice-president of New Regency in charge of physical production. As of 2021, he was a production manager of Amazon Studios.

References

External links

1960 births
Living people
American film producers
American film studio executives
American television producers
American male screenwriters
Place of birth missing (living people)